Alopoglossus is a genus of lizards in the monogeneric family Alopoglossidae. The genus is distributed from Costa Rica in Central America to northern South America.

Species
The genus Alopoglossus contains the following 32 valid species:
Alopoglossus amazonius  – Amazonanian teiid
Alopoglossus andeanus 
Alopoglossus angulatus  – northern teiid
Alopoglossus atriventris  – keel-bellied shade lizard 
Alopoglossus avilapiresae 
Alopoglossus bicolor  – Werner's largescale lizard
Alopoglossus bilineatus 
Alopoglossus brevifrontalis   – Boulenger's largescale lizard
Alopoglossus buckleyi   – Buckley's teiid
Alopoglossus carinicaudatus  – northern teiid
Alopoglossus collii 
Alopoglossus copii  – drab shade lizard
Alopoglossus danieli  – Daniel's largescale lizard
Alopoglossus embera 
Alopoglossus eurylepis  – largescale lizard
Alopoglossus festae 
Alopoglossus gansorum 
Alopoglossus gorgonae 
Alopoglossus grandisquamatus  – common largescale lizard
Alopoglossus harrisi 
Alopoglossus indigenorum 
Alopoglossus kugleri  – Kugler's largescale lizard
Alopoglossus lehmanni  
Alopoglossus meloi  
Alopoglossus myersi 
Alopoglossus plicatus  – Taylor's largescale lizard
Alopoglossus romaleos 
Alopoglossus stenolepis 
Alopoglossus tapajosensis 
Alopoglossus theodorusi 
Alopoglossus vallensis 
Alopoglossus viridiceps  – green-headed shade lizard

Nota bene: A binomial authority in parentheses indicates that the species was originally described in a genus other than Alopoglossus.

References

Further reading
Boulenger GA (1885). Catalogue of the Lizards in the British Museum (Natural History). Second Edition. Volume II. ... Teiidæ ... London: Trustees of the British Museum (Natural History). (Taylor and Francis, printers). xiii + 497 pp. + Plates I-XXIV. (Alopoglossus, new genus, p. 383).

 
Lizard genera
Taxa named by George Albert Boulenger
Monogeneric reptile families